Emmitt James Smith IV (born May 15, 2002) is an American football running back for the Stanford Cardinal. He is the son of former National Football League running back Emmitt Smith. He was named to the Doak Walker Award watch list prior to the 2022 season.

Early years
Smith was born in approximately 2002. He is the son of Pro Football Hall of Famer Emmitt Smith, the leading rusher in NFL history. E. J. attended Jesuit College Preparatory School of Dallas. He tallied 902 rushing yards in 2019 and 872 rushing yards in 2018. He was rated by ESPN as the No. 48 prospect in the Class of 2020.

Stanford
Smith enrolled at Stanford in 2020. He appeared in two games as a freshman but had no rushing carries and caught three passes for seven yards. 

As a sophomore in 2021, he was used principally as a backup to Austin Jones and Nathaniel Peat. He scored his first collegiate touchdown against Vanderbilt on September 18, 2021. With limited playing time in 2021, Smith rushed 26 times for 133 yards (5.1 yards per carry) and caught 15 passes for 74 yards.

2022 season
After the 2021 season, Austin Jones transferred to USC, and Nathaniel Peat transferred to Missouri. Smith was slated to take over in 2022 as Stanford's top running back. Going into the 2022 season, Stanford coach David Shaw called Smith "the total package" and predicted that he would be "one of the best backs in America" over the next two seasons. 

Pro Football Focus rated Smith as one its 31 breakout candidates, only two of whom are running backs, for the 2022 college football season. Pro Football Focus cited Smith's 14 broken tackles in 2021 along with five explosive runs and "excellent vision, patience and elusiveness as a runner." He was also named to the 2022 Doak Walker Award watch list. 

On his first carry of the 2022 season, Smith ran 87 yards for a touchdown. He finished that game with 118 rushing yards and two touchdowns on 11 carries. He totaled 206 rushing yards with three touchdowns in the first two games. However, his season ended prematurely due to an injury.

References

External links
 Stanford bio

Year of birth missing (living people)
2000s births
Living people
American football running backs
Stanford Cardinal football players
Players of American football from Dallas